Forerunner may refer to:

Religion
 A holy person announcing the approaching appearance of a prophet, see precursor (religion).
 As a title, used in particular for John the Baptist within Christianity, and especially within the Eastern Orthodox tradition.

Other
Forerunner (album), by Canadian band The Cottars
 The Forerunner (book) by Kahlil Gibran
Forerunner (stamp), in philately,  a postage stamp used before a region can produce its own stamps
Forerunner (Halo), an ancient race in the Halo videogame series
Forerunner (Dungeons & Dragons), a race of humans in the role-playing game
Forerunner (robot), a humanoid robot developed by China
Forerunner (magazine), an American magazine of the early 20th century
The Forerunner, an internationally distributed Christian campus newspaper from 1981 to 1994
Garmin Forerunner, a global positioning system device for recreational runners
Forerunner (DC Comics), a fictional DC Comics character
Toyota 4Runner, a model of passenger vehicle